On September 29, 2005, three near-simultaneous car bombs exploded in Balad, Iraq. The bombs went off in a busy vegetable market, by a bank and by a police station. More than 95 were killed and 100 wounded.

References

2005 murders in Iraq
21st-century mass murder in Iraq
Suicide car and truck bombings in Iraq
Mass murder in 2005
Terrorist incidents in Iraq in 2005
September 2005 events in Iraq
Balad, Iraq